George Lyon, 5th Lord Glamis (died 1505) was a Scottish nobleman. He was the eldest son of John Lyon, 4th Lord Glamis, who he succeeded in 1500. He died young in February 1505 and was succeeded by his brother John Lyon, 6th Lord Glamis.

15th-century Scottish people
Lords of Parliament (pre-1707)
1505 deaths
Year of birth unknown